Gonçalo Álvares (?? – 1524) was a Portuguese explorer who actively  participated in the Age of Discovery, starting from the second voyage of Diogo Cão.

In 1497 he commanded the ship São Gabriel in the epic journey of Vasco da Gama to India, and in 1505, aboard the fleet of Francisco de Almeida – the first Viceroy of Portuguese India – he sailed south in the Atlantic to where "water and even wine froze", and discovered an island that was named after him. It was later renamed Gough Island by the British, who took possession in the nineteenth century.

Gonçalo Álvares held the office of chief-pilot of the navigation to India and the Ocean Sea until his death in 1524.

References 

Portuguese explorers
Explorers of Asia
15th-century explorers
16th-century explorers
1524 deaths
15th-century births
Maritime history of Portugal
15th-century Portuguese people
16th-century Portuguese people